Springfield Township is a township in York County, Pennsylvania, United States. The population was 6,023 at the 2020 census.

History
The South Road Bridge, Northern Central Railway was added to the National Register of Historic Places in 1995.

Geography
The township completely surrounds the boroughs of Loganville and Jacobus, and the borough of Seven Valleys is located along the northwestern edge of the township.

Demographics
At the 2000 census there were 3,889 people, 1,444 households, and 1,143 families living in the township.  The population density was 148.4 people per square mile (57.3/km2).  There were 1,506 housing units at an average density of 57.5/sq mi (22.2/km2).  The racial makeup of the township was 98.79% White, 0.39% African American, 0.05% Native American, 0.36% Asian, and 0.41% from two or more races. Hispanic or Latino of any race were 0.54%.

Of the 1,444 households 34.7% had children under the age of 18 living with them, 71.3% were married couples living together, 5.5% had a female householder with no husband present, and 20.8% were non-families. 15.7% of households were one person and 6.7% were one person aged 65 or older.  The average household size was 2.69 and the average family size was 3.02.

The age distribution was 24.7% under the age of 18, 7.0% from 18 to 24, 27.7% from 25 to 44, 29.3% from 45 to 64, and 11.3% 65 or older.  The median age was 40 years. For every 100 females there were 102.3 males.  For every 100 females age 18 and over, there were 98.7 males.

The median household income was $59,250 and the median family income  was $63,281. Males had a median income of $41,513 versus $27,197 for females. The per capita income for the township was $27,410.  About 3.3% of families and 4.4% of the population were below the poverty line, including 5.9% of those under age 18 and 3.8% of those age 65 or over.

References

Populated places established in 1763
Townships in York County, Pennsylvania